Route 247 is a collector road in the Canadian province of Nova Scotia.

It is located on Cape Breton Island in Richmond County and connects St. Peters at Trunk 4 with Lower L'Ardoise.

Communities
St. Peter's
Point Michaud
L'Ardoise
Grande Greve
Grand River
Lower L'Ardoise

Parks
Point Michaud Beach Provincial Park
Battery Provincial Park

See also
List of Nova Scotia provincial highways

References

Nova Scotia provincial highways
Roads in Richmond County, Nova Scotia